The Salt Lake and Utah Railroad, also known as the Orem Line or Orem Interurban, was an electric railroad which operated between downtown Salt Lake City and Payson, Utah, United States. Construction of the main line was started in 1913 with financing provided by A. J. Orem & Company, with Walter C. Orem as president. The railroad opened in 1914 with stops in both Utah and Salt Lake counties. The railroad also operated a branch line which ran to Magna. Both passenger and freight service was offered. The line's terminus in downtown Salt Lake City was shared with the Bamberger Railroad, and was located at the current site of Abravanel Hall. The railroad stopped service in 1946.

See also
 Timpanogos Cooperative Marketing Association Building – Former depot

References

Defunct Utah railroads
Railway lines opened in 1914
Railway lines closed in 1946
1914 establishments in Utah
1946 disestablishments in Utah